Muhammad Iqbal Abdul Rahman is a Singaporean Pencak Silat exponent. He specialises in the "Singles (Tunggal) category". Iqbal is notable for winning Singapore's 1st gold medal at the 31st SEA Games 2021, held in Hanoi, Vietnam. Iqbal has won the world championship title at the 18th World Pencak Silat Championship 2018 in Singapore. He is also a 4 times Asian Championship gold medalist.

Awards

References 

Singaporean martial artists
Year of birth missing (living people)
Living people
Southeast Asian Games gold medalists for Singapore
Southeast Asian Games silver medalists for Singapore
Southeast Asian Games bronze medalists for Singapore
Competitors at the 2015 Southeast Asian Games
Competitors at the 2019 Southeast Asian Games
Competitors at the 2021 Southeast Asian Games